Sausalito a.k.a. Love at First Sight is a 2000 Hong Kong film directed by Andrew Lau.

Plot
Mike (Leon Lai) is the founder of an online company, while Ellen (Maggie Cheung) is a divorcee parenting her son Scott. They fall in love, but their relationship ends following the closing of Mike's company. A year later, an earthquake occurs and they set out to find the other.

Cast and roles
 Maggie Cheung - Ellen
 Leon Lai - Mike
 Scott Leong - Scott
 Saisie M. Jang - Mel G
 AnnieScott Rogers - Wealthy Lady
 Valerie Chow - Virginia Chow
 Alan Draven - Taxi driver
 Mark Hefti - Tony
 Eric Kot - Bob
 Suki Kwan - Tina
 Carl Ng - Mike's friend
 Richard Ng - Robert
 Jed Rowen - Homeless Man (credited as Jed Low)
 Edmund Oscar Tam - Kid's Friend
 Karl-Heinz Teuber		
 Theresa Walsh - Hot girl in bar
 Tamara Torres - Bus stop patron (uncredited)
 Jude S. Walko - Fillmore groupie (uncredited)
 Jeffrey Lei - Taxi driver (credited as King Kong)

See also
 Love at first sight

External links
 IMDb entry
 [www.hkcinemagic.com/en/movie.asp?id=443 HKCinemagic entry]

Hong Kong romance films
2000 films
Films directed by Andrew Lau
Films set in San Francisco
2000s Hong Kong films